Schuback is a surname. Notable people with the surname include:

Bengt Schuback (1928–2015), Swedish Navy vice admiral
Ian Schuback (born 1952), Australian lawn bowler
Jacob Schuback (born 1983), Australian rules footballer
Nicolaus Schuback (1700–1783), German lawyer and mayor